Kenneth Alan Parish (born 20 September 1953) is a former Australian politician. He was the Labor member for Millner in the Northern Territory Legislative Assembly from 1991 to 1994.

|}

In early 2020, Parish joined Territory Alliance, a newly formed political party led by former Country Liberal Party (CLP) Chief Minister Terry Mills.

References

1953 births
Living people
Members of the Northern Territory Legislative Assembly
Australian Labor Party members of the Northern Territory Legislative Assembly